Mohamed Salah Mzali (11 February 1896 – 22 November 1984) was a Tunisian educator, historian and politician. He was Prime Minister of Tunisia for a brief period in 1954 under Muhammad VIII al-Amin.

Mohamed Salah Mzali is a descent of the Ait Mzal clan of the Masmuda tribe of the Sous who had established the Hafsid dynasty, he is also a relative of Mohammed Mzali.

Biography 
For ten years, he followed a government career at the head of the ministries of Habous, Trade and Handicrafts and Industry, including the second government of Chenik in 1950. He was arrested and deported to the south of the country with the entire government during the crackdown of March 1952.

Released a year later, he was chosen by the colonial authorities to form a government in February 1953. On 2 March, he was appointed Grand Vizier. His government, composed of competent and honest administrators.
Mzali is also a member of the steering committee of the Carthage Institute and the editorial board of the Tunisian Journal; he also collaborates with Al Fajr magazine, Al Majalla zeitounia, etc.

He is a laureate of the Alliance Française, the Académie des Jeux Floraux and other literary competitions.

Publications
 L'Hérédité dans la dynastie husseinite: évolution et violations
 Au fil de ma vie: souvenirs d'un Tunisien

References

Charles-André Julien, Et la Tunisie devint indépendante: 1951-1957, éd. Jeune Afrique, Paris, 1985, p. 124

1896 births
1984 deaths
20th-century Tunisian historians
Berber historians
Berber Tunisians
Masmuda
Prime Ministers of Tunisia
Tunisian educators
Tunisian Berber politicians
Tunisian people of Moroccan descent